Dopamine beta-hydroxylase (DBH), also known as dopamine beta-monooxygenase, is an enzyme that in humans is encoded by the DBH gene. Dopamine beta-hydroxylase catalyzes the conversion of dopamine to norepinephrine.

The three substrates of the enzyme are dopamine, vitamin C (ascorbate), and O2. The products are norepinephrine, dehydroascorbate, and H2O.

DBH is a 290 kDa copper-containing oxygenase consisting of four identical subunits, and its activity requires ascorbate as a cofactor.

It is the only enzyme involved in the synthesis of small-molecule neurotransmitters that is membrane-bound, making norepinephrine the only known transmitter synthesized inside vesicles.  It is expressed in noradrenergic neurons of the central nervous system (i.e. locus coeruleus) and peripheral nervous systems (i.e. sympathetic ganglia), as well as in chromaffin cells of the adrenal medulla.

Mechanism of catalysis 

Based on the observations of what happens when there is no substrate, or oxygen, the following steps seem to constitute the hydroxylation reaction.

Although details of DBH mechanism are yet to be confirmed, DBH is homologous to another enzyme, peptidylglycine α-hydroxylating monooxygenase (PHM). Because DBH and PHM share similar structures, it is possible to model DBH mechanism based on what is known about PHM mechanism.

Substrate specificity 

Dopamine beta-hydroxylase catalyzes the hydroxylation of not only dopamine but also other phenylethylamine derivatives when available. The minimum requirement seems to be the phenylethylamine skeleton: a benzene ring with a two-carbon side chain that terminates in an amino group.

Assays for DBH activity in human serum and Cerebrospinal fluid 

DBH activity in human serum could be estimated by a spectrophotometric method  or with the aid of Ultra high performance liquid chromatography with Photo Diode Array detector (UHPLC-PDA). A sensitive assay for the detection of DBH activity in cerebrospinal fluid using High-performance liquid chromatography with Electrochemical detector(HPLC-ECD) was also described earlier.

Expression quantitative trait loci (eQTLs) at DBH loci 
Genetic variants such as single-nucleotide polymorphisms(SNPs) at DBH loci were found to be associated with DBH activity and are well known expression quantitative trait loci. Allele variants at two regulatory SNPs namely rs1611115  and rs1989787  were shown to affect transcription of this gene. Mutations identified in dopamine beta hydroxylase deficiency and non-synonymous SNPs such as rs6271 in this gene were found to cause defective secretion of the protein from  the endoplasmic reticulum.

Clinical significance 
DBH primarily contributes to catecholamine and trace amine biosynthesis. It also participates in the metabolism of xenobiotics related to these substances; for example, the human DBH enzyme catalyzes the beta-hydroxylation of amphetamine and para-hydroxyamphetamine, producing norephedrine and para-hydroxynorephedrine respectively.

DBH has been implicated as correlating factor in conditions associated with decision making and addictive drugs, e.g., alcoholism and smoking, attention deficit hyperactivity disorder, schizophrenia, and Alzheimer's disease. Inadequate DBH is called dopamine beta hydroxylase deficiency.

The proximal promoter SNPs rs1989787  and rs1611115 were found to be associated with cognition in schizophrenia subjects. Further these SNPs (rs1989787;rs1611115) and  a distal promoter variant 19bp Ins/Del(rs141116007) were associated with scores of Abnormal Involuntary Movement Scale in Tardive dyskinesia positive  schizophrenia subjects. Of the three variants, the proximal promoter SNP(rs1611115) was associated with  Positive and Negative Syndrome Scale(PANSS) scores in Tardive dyskinesia positive  schizophrenia subjects.

Structure 
It was difficult to obtain a stable crystal of dopamine beta-hydroxylase. Hence an homology model based on the primary sequence and comparison to PHM is available.

However, a crystal structure was also put forward in 2016.

Regulation and inhibition 
This protein may use the morpheein model of allosteric regulation.

Inhibitors 

DBH is inhibited by disulfiram, tropolone, and, most selectively, by nepicastat.

DBH is reversibly inhibited by l-2H-Phthalazine hydrazone (hydralazine; HYD), 2-1H-pyridinone hydrazone (2-hydrazinopyridine; HP), 2-quinoline-carboxylic acid (QCA), l-isoquinolinecarboxylic acid (IQCA), 2,2'-bi-lH-imidazole (2,2'-biimidazole; BI), and IH-imidazole-4-acetic acid (imidazole-4-acetic acid; IAA). HYD, QCA, and IAA are allosteric competitive.

Nomenclature 
The systematic name of this enzyme class is 3,4-dihydroxyphenethylamine, ascorbate:oxygen oxidoreductase (beta-hydroxylating).

Other names in common use include:

 dopamine beta-monooxygenase
 dopamine beta-hydroxylase
 membrane-associated dopamine beta-monooxygenase (MDBH)
 soluble dopamine beta-monooxygenase (SDBH)
 dopamine-B-hydroxylase
 3,4-dihydroxyphenethylamine beta-oxidase
 4-(2-aminoethyl) pyrocatechol beta-oxidase
 dopa beta-hydroxylase
 dopamine beta-oxidase
 dopamine hydroxylase
 phenylamine beta-hydroxylase
 (3,4-dihydroxyphenethylamine) beta-mono-oxygenase

References

Further reading

External links 
  GeneReviews/NIH/NCBI/UW entry on Dopamine Beta-Hydroxylase Deficiency
 

EC 1.14.17
Copper enzymes
Enzymes of known structure
Biology of attention deficit hyperactivity disorder
Amphetamine